Muhammad Inam Butt is a Pakistani professional wrestler.

He won the country's second gold medal at the 2010 Commonwealth Games, bronze medal at the 2014 Asian Beach Games, gold medal at the 2016 South Asian Games, gold medal at the 2016 Asian Beach Games, silver medal at the 2016 Commonwealth Wrestling Championship, gold medal at the 2017 World Beach Wrestling Championships, silver medal at the 2017 Commonwealth Wrestling Championship. Butt won a gold medal at the 2018 Commonwealth Games, the gold medal at the 2018 World Beach Wrestling Championships, gold medal at the 2019 South Asian Games, silver medal at the 2019 World Beach Series, gold medal at the 2019 ANOC World Beach Games, bronze medal at the 2021 Asian Olympics Qualify Rounds, gold medal at the 2021 World Beach Series, and a gold medal at the 2021 World Beach Wrestling Series.

Career

2010
Inam participated in the 84 kg class freestyle at the 2010 Commonwealth Games in New Delhi, India. He won the gold medal in freestyle wrestling against his Indian opponent, Anuj Kumar on points (3-1).

2014 
Inam was selected to participate in the 2014 Commonwealth Games in Glasgow, UK.

Inam was selected to participate in the 2014 Asian beach Games in Phuket, Thailand. Then Inam participated in the 90+ kg class Beach style. He won the bronze medal in Beach wrestling against his Serian opponent, on points (3-0).

2016
Inam participated in the 86 kg class freestyle at the 2016 12th South Asian Games in Guwahati, India. He won the gold medal in freestyle wrestling against his Indian opponent, Gopal Yaduv on points (12-4).

Inam also participated in the -90 kg class Beach wrestling|freestyle at the 2016 5th Beach Asian Games in Danang, Vietnam. He won the gold medal in freestyle wrestling against his Iranian opponent, on points (3-0).

Inam also participated in the 86 kg class freestyle at the 2016 Commonwealth Wrestling Championship in Singapore. He won the silver medal in freestyle wrestling there.

2018
Inam bagged the gold medal in the 86 kg category at the 2018 Commonwealth Games, Gold Coast by beating his opponent Nigeria's Bibo by 3:0.

2021
Inam Butt missed out on the 2020 Summer Olympics due to the COVID-19 pandemic. Inam won the gold medal in the 90  kg category at the Beach wrestling world series freestyle at 2021 in Rome, Italy. Butt secured victory by beating his Ukrainian opponent by 3–0 in the final.

Awards 
He has received Pride of Performance award on 23 March 2019.

References

External links 
 Inam Butt on Facebook
 Inam Butt on Twitter
 Inam Butt on Instagram

Pakistani male sport wrestlers
Living people
Asian Games competitors for Pakistan
Commonwealth Games gold medallists for Pakistan
Commonwealth Games silver medallists for Pakistan
Wrestlers at the 2010 Commonwealth Games
Wrestlers at the 2014 Commonwealth Games
Wrestlers at the 2018 Commonwealth Games
Wrestlers at the 2022 Commonwealth Games
Commonwealth Games medallists in wrestling
Wrestlers at the 2010 Asian Games
Wrestlers at the 2014 Asian Games
Recipients of the Pride of Performance
South Asian Games gold medalists for Pakistan
1989 births
South Asian Games medalists in wrestling
Pakistani people of Kashmiri descent
Sportspeople from Gujranwala
20th-century Pakistani people
21st-century Pakistani people
Medallists at the 2010 Commonwealth Games
Medallists at the 2018 Commonwealth Games
Medallists at the 2022 Commonwealth Games